Joachim Joseph Gruppelaar (24 October 1911 – 12 July 1971) was a Dutch equestrian. He competed at the 1948 Summer Olympics in jumping and finished in 20th place. Gruppelaar held a military rank of major in 1948.

References

1911 births
1971 deaths
Dutch show jumping riders
Equestrians at the 1948 Summer Olympics
Olympic equestrians of the Netherlands
Dutch male equestrians
Sportspeople from Amersfoort
20th-century Dutch people